Fault Tolerant Messaging or Failover Abstraction is the ability to transparently “failover” 
a call or request from one service transport protocol to another upon failure with no 
changes to the functional code or business logic implementation. In elemenope, this ability to “failover” is achieved via Dispatcher Failover [DFO] configuration. The elemenope framework has the ability to configure multiple nested failover chains. A typical use of the DFo functionality is the 
failover from a synchronous service transport protocol to an asynchronous service transport 
protocol. For instance, when an XML-RPC service is down, the messages may be failed 
over to an asynchronous JMS queue implementation for processing when the service is 
available.

Sources
 elemenope User Guide

External links
As of 29 May 2007, this article is derived in whole or in part from The Elemenope User Guide. The copyright holder has licensed the content utilized under GFDL. All relevant terms must be followed.
elemenope home page
elemenope User Guide

Software architecture